Engina mendicaria, common name striped engina or bumble bee snail, is a species of sea snail, a marine gastropod mollusk in the family Pisaniidae.

Description

The shell size varies between 10 mm and 20 mm. This shell shows a white or yellowish background with a few transversal black bands and resembles the yellow and black pattern of wasps and bees (hence a common name).

Distribution
This species is distributed in the Red Sea and in the Indian Ocean along Aldabra, Chagos, Kenya, Madagascar, Mauritius, Mozambique, Tanzania, in the tropical Indo-Pacific and Australia.

Habitat
These carnivore sea snails live on rocky shores and sand beds. They are mainly nocturnal.

References

 Dautzenberg, Ph. (1929). Mollusques testaces marins de Madagascar. Faune des Colonies Francaises, Tome III
 Kalk, M. (1958). The fauna of the intertidal rocks at Inhaca Island, Delagoa Bay. Ann. Natal Mus. 14: 189–242
 Richmond, M. (Ed.) (1997). A guide to the seashores of Eastern Africa and the Western Indian Ocean islands. Sida/Department for Research Cooperation, SAREC: Stockholm, Sweden. . 448 pp.

External links
 

Pisaniidae
Gastropods described in 1758
Taxa named by Carl Linnaeus